Soul City may also refer to:
 Soul City, North Carolina
 Soul City Records (British label), a British record label
 Soul City Records (American label), an American label founded by singer and musician Johnny Rivers
 Soul City (novel), a 2005 American novel by Touré